Carlos Athié (born Carlos Harfuch Álvarez; on February 27, 1987, in Mexico City, Mexico) is a Mexican actor, model and TV presenter.

Life

He played a cocaine addict in The White Route (Alejandro Sandoval The White Route) that was produced by Caracol Television and Cadenatres, the naughty wet back "Lucas" in Una Maid in ManhattanUna Maid en Manhattan (2011-2012) by Telemundo of the Telemundo Network (2011-2012), a dark bisexual character in The Traps of Desire, and a naive architect in the tele-series directed by Fernando Sariñana "Amor Sin Reserva".

Filmography

References

External links
 
 

1987 births
Living people
Mexican male telenovela actors
Mexican male television actors
Mexican male models
Mexican composers
Mexican male composers
Male actors from Mexico City
21st-century Mexican male actors